Aldijana Mašinović (born 3 July 1998) is a Bosnia and Herzegovina footballer who plays as a midfielder for Austrian ÖFB-Frauenliga club SV Neulengbach and the Bosnia and Herzegovina women's national team.

Club career
Mašinović has played for Baden Casino and Neulengbach in Austria.

International career
Mašinović made her senior debut for Bosnia and Herzegovina on 22 January 2020 as a 66th-minute substitution in a 3–2 friendly away win over Montenegro.

References

External links

1998 births
Living people
Bosnia and Herzegovina women's footballers
Women's association football midfielders
SV Neulengbach (women) players
ÖFB-Frauenliga players
Bosnia and Herzegovina women's international footballers
Bosnia and Herzegovina expatriate women's footballers
Bosnia and Herzegovina expatriate sportspeople in Austria
Expatriate women's footballers in Austria